Xyphosia miliaria is a species of tephritid or fruit flies in the family Tephritidae.

Distribution
This species is present in most of Europe, in the eastern Palearctic realm, and in the Near East.

Habitat
This species occurs in wet meadows, in parks and gardens with the presence of thistles.

Description

Xyphosia miliaria may have a body length of 5 to 8 mm and a wingspan of 15 to 18 mm. The thorax and the abdomen are yellowish,  sparsely covered with long bristles and the mesonotum is longer than wide. The abdomen is round in males, elongated in the females and the females bear at the end of the abdomen a dark brown, pointed ovipositor. The large compound eyes are orange-red. The wings are decorated with distinctive dark apical and transversal drawings.

Biology
The adults fly from May to September feeding on nectar and pollen of various flowering plants. Larvae develop on buds of thistles (Carduus nutans, Cirsium arvense, Cirsium palustre, Cirsium eriophorum).

Gallery

Bibliography
Merz, B. - Faunistics of the Tephritidae of the Iberian Peninsula and the Baleares in Mitt. Schweiz. Entomol. Ges. 
Norrbom, A. L., Carroll, L. E., Thompson, F. C., White, I. M. & Freidberg, A. - Systematic database of names in Thompson, F. C. (Ed.) Fruit Fly Expert System and Systematic Information Database. Myia.
Seguy, E. - F. Trypetidae in Faune de France. 28. Dipteres (Brachyceres) (Muscidae Acalypterae et Scatophagidae)
White, I. M. - Tephritid flies (Diptera: Tephritidae) in Handbooks for the Identification of British Insects.10 (ser. 5a)

References

External links
 Nature Spot
 Eakringbirds
 Barry Fotopage

Tephritinae
Insects described in 1781
Articles containing video clips
Diptera of Europe
Diptera of Asia